Tytthostonyx is a genus of prehistoric seabird. Found in the much-debated Hornerstown Formation which straddles the Cretaceous–Paleogene boundary 66 million years ago, this animal was apparently closely related to the ancestor of some modern birds, such as Procellariiformes and/or "Pelecaniformes". A single species is placed herein, Tytthostonyx glauconiticus.

It has been placed into a family of its own, Tytthostonychidae.

References

Procellariiformes
Prehistoric bird genera
Late Cretaceous birds of North America
Extinct birds of North America
Fossil taxa described in 1987